This list of school massacres by death toll contains those cases that occurred at kindergartens, schools and universities, as well as their affiliated buildings. If the perpetrator was a member of the school staff and the victims primarily their colleagues, the case is not included here but added to the list of workplace killings. Schools massacres are counted as incidents involving at least two deaths, excluding the potential death of the perpetrator.

All abbreviations used in the table are explained below.

Overall list

Abbreviations and footnotes 

# indicates the ranking of the massacre by number of deaths (since this is a List enumerated by death toll, not by date or by number of overall casualties).

The W-column gives a basic description of the weapons in the shootings.
F – Firearms and other ranged weapons, especially rifles and handguns, but also bows and crossbows, grenade launchers, flamethrowers, or slingshots
M – Melee weapons, like knives, swords, spears, machetes, axes, clubs, rods, rocks, or bare hands
O – Any other weapons, such as bombs, hand grenades, Molotov cocktails, poison and poisonous gas, as well as vehicle and arson attacks
A – indicates that an arson attack was the only other weapon used
V – indicates that a vehicle was the only other weapon used
E – indicates that explosives of any sort were the only other weapon used

Notes

Rampage killers
This section of the list of rampage killers contains those cases that occurred at pre-schools, schools and universities, as well as their affiliated buildings, and are considered lone wolf attacks. If the perpetrator was a member of the school staff and the victims primarily his colleagues, the case is not included here, but it is added to the list of rampage workplace killings.

A rampage killer has been defined as follows:

This list should contain every case with at least one of the following features:
 Rampage killings with 6 or more dead 
 Rampage killings with at least 4 people killed and least ten victims overall (dead plus injured)
 Rampage killings with at least 2 people killed and least 12 victims overall (dead plus injured)
 An incidence of rampage killing shall not be included in this list if it does not include at least two people killed.
 In all cases the perpetrator is not counted among those killed or injured.

Abbreviations and footnotes

The W-column gives a basic description of the weapons used in the murders
F – Firearms and other ranged weapons, especially rifles and handguns, but also bows and crossbows, grenade launchers, flamethrowers, or slingshot
M – Melee weapons, like knives, swords, spears, machetes, axes, clubs, rods, rocks, or bare hands
O – Any other weapons, such as bombs, hand grenades, Molotov cocktails, poison and poisonous gas, as well as vehicle and arson attacks
A – indicates that an arson attack was the only other weapon used
V – indicates that a vehicle was the only other weapon used
E – indicates that explosives of any sort were the only other weapon used
P – indicates that an anaesthetising or deadly substance of any kind was the only other weapon used (includes poisonous gas)

See also 

 List of disasters in the United States by death toll
 List of school shootings in the United States (before 2000)
 List of school shootings in the United States (2000–present)
 List of school-related attacks
 School bullying
 School shooting
 School violence

References

External links 
 Post traumatic stress disorder information for caregivers, professionals and clinicians from The National Child Traumatic Stress Network

School massacres

Massacres by death toll
school